Terry Scales may refer to:

 Terry Scales (painter), English painter and writer
 Terry Scales (footballer), English footballer and manager